Sami Wahlsten (born November 25, 1967) is a Finnish former professional ice hockey player who primarily played in the Finnish Liiga. Wahlsten was drafted in the seventh round of the 1986 NHL Entry Draft by the Philadelphia Flyers, but he never played professionally in North America. He spent most of his professional career in Finland, playing nine seasons in the Liiga with TPS, Jokerit, and Ilves. He is the son of Juhani Wahlsten and brother of Jali Wahlsten.

References

External links

1967 births
Living people
HC Alleghe players
Brest Albatros Hockey players
Finnish ice hockey right wingers
EV Füssen players
Ilves players
Jokerit players
EC KAC players
LHC Les Lions players
Manchester Storm (1995–2002) players
Newcastle Riverkings players
Philadelphia Flyers draft picks
SC Riessersee players
Sportspeople from Turku
HC TPS players